The following lists events that happened during 1934 in Saudi Arabia.

Incumbents
 Monarch: Ibn Saud
 Crown Prince: Ibn Saud

Events

June
 June 27 - North Yemen and Saudi Arabia conclude a peace treaty.

References

 
1930s in Saudi Arabia
Years of the 20th century in Saudi Arabia
Saudi Arabia
Saudi Arabia